The El Paso Paso del Norte (PDN) Port of Entry is a crossing of the United States–Mexico border, connecting the U.S. city of El Paso, Texas with the Mexican city of Ciudad Juárez, Chihuahua. It is among the busiest border crossings between the two countries: more than 10 million people enter the U.S. from Mexico each year at this location. The PDN Port of Entry is located at the Paso del Norte International Bridge, and is limited to northbound non-commercial traffic, although pedestrians may also cross the bridge in the southbound direction.

Bridges between El Paso and Ciudad Juárez have existed at this location for over 250 years, and they have been rebuilt many times due to floods, expansion, and international treaties. The PDN is sometimes called the Santa Fe bridge, because its predecessor (prior to 1967) emptied traffic onto Santa Fe Street immediately to the west. Approximately 2,000 trains enter the U.S. each year on an adjacent rail bridge. Streetcar traffic also once entered the U.S. on the Paso del Norte Bridge, but that service ended in 1974.

The PDN Port of Entry ranks second only to the San Ysidro Port of Entry in the number of pedestrians entering the U.S. from Mexico each year.

References

See also
 List of Mexico–United States border crossings
 List of Canada–United States border crossings

Mexico–United States border crossings
Buildings and structures in El Paso, Texas
1898 establishments in Texas